Philip Thorpe Priestley BSc FSA MBHI (born 15 May 1936 died 9 March 2018) was an English scientist and inventor.

Priestley was born in Lincoln and from 2012 lived in Newark, Nottinghamshire.  He was educated at Lincoln City (Grammar) School 1946-1954 and at the University of Nottingham 1954-57 (BSc Hons Chemistry). He joined Kodak Limited in the UK and worked as an IT Manager at several locations including the USA (4 years for Eastman Kodak). He holds several patents in the fields of measuring small temperature differences and thermometric reaction instrumentation. He served in the Royal Air Force for National Service as an Electronics Instructor. From 1966 he was involved in the acquisition and application of the earliest process control computers to the manufacturing process. He later became responsible for installing large commercial computers in Kodak. He retired from Kodak at the beginning of 1993.

In retirement, he expanded his long-term interest in antique watches, specialising in those made in the USA. Whilst living in the US, he completed his seminal work on Watch Case Makers of England 1720 -1920, being the first book detailing the trade of case making, makers and their marks registered at the various assay offices, published 1994. In 2000 this was followed by a second book, Early Watch Case Makers of England 1631 to 1720, also published in the US by the National Association of Watch and Clock Collectors Inc (NAWCC). In 2002 he contributed to a seminar in Massachusetts entitled Boston: Cradle of Industrial Watchmaking the proceedings of which were published in 2005 by NAWCC. In 2004 he jointly, with the late Canon Maurice Ridgway, wrote The Compendium of Chester Gold & Silver Marks 1570 to 1962: from the Chester Assay Office Registers published by the Antique Collectors' Club Ltd, England. His final book Aaron Lufkin Dennison, An Industrial Pioneer and his Legacy was published by the NAWCC in 2010. Dennison was a co-founder of the prestigious Waltham Watch Company of Massachusetts in 1850 and the Dennison Watch Case Company of Handsworth, Birmingham, England in 1874.

Priestley was a member of Chiltern District Council for 26 years, retiring in 2011 representing Chalfont Common and later Chesham Bois & Weedon Hill Wards being Chairman of Council from 2007 to 2009. In 2016, Philip was made an Honorary Alderman of Chiltern District Council.

He was a Fellow of the London Society of Antiquaries, a Freeman of Lincoln and London, a member of the Silver Society and the Jewellery/Plate/Horology Society, a professional Member of the British Horological Institute, a Silver Star Fellow of the NAWCC, a member of the Antiquarian Horological Society and a Liveryman of the Clockmakers' Company.

References

2018 deaths
1936 births
English scientists
English inventors